The Colossus of Rhodes is a 1954 oil painting by the Spanish surrealist Salvador Dalí. It is one of a series of seven paintings he created for the 1956 film Seven Wonders of the World, each depicting one of the wonders. The work shows the Colossus of Rhodes, the ancient statue of the Greek titan-god of the sun, Helios. The painting was not used for the film and was donated to the Kunstmuseum Bern in 1981, where it remains.

Painted two decades after Dalí's heyday with the surrealist movement, the painting epitomises his shift from the avant-garde to the mainstream. Pressured by financial concerns after his move to the United States in 1940, and influenced by his fascination with Hollywood, Dalí shifted focus away from his earlier exploration of the subconscious and perception, and towards historical and scientific themes.

Dalí's rendering was influenced by a 1953 paper by Herbert Maryon, a sculptor and conservator at the British Museum. Maryon proposed that the historical Colossus was hollow, formed from hammered bronze plates, and located alongside the harbour rather than astride it. He further suggested that it used a hanging drapery to give the statue a stable tripod base. These elements were all incorporated by Dalí.

Background

The Colossus 

The Colossus of Rhodes was a monumental statue of the Greek sun god, Helios, that stood by the harbour of Rhodes for more than half a century in the third century BC. According to first-century BC historian Diodorus Siculus, it was constructed under the direction of Chares of Lindos to commemorate the city's victory over Demetrius Poliorcetes, who laid siege to Rhodes from 305 to 304 BC; Helios, patron saint of both the city and island of Rhodes, was chosen as the honoree. The statue stood until the 226 BC Rhodes earthquake, when, according to Pliny the Elder three centuries later in his Naturalis Historia, it buckled and fell. In his ninth-century AD Chronographia, Theophanes the Confessor wrote that its ruins remained until 652–53, when Muawiyah I conquered Rhodes and the Colossus was sold for scrap. Beginning with lists formed by Diodorus and other writers, the Colossus is recognized as one of the Seven Wonders of the Ancient World.

There are no extant contemporary depictions of the Colossus; the only evidence is textual, much of it summary and postdating the statue by centuries. Imagination has frequently filled in for documentation. Scientific attempts to re-envision the Colossus have persisted since the eighteenth century. In a presentation delivered in 1953, Herbert Maryon suggested that the statue was hollow, and stood aside the harbour rather than astride it. Although Maryon's theory was not published until 1956, two years after Dalí's painting, newspaper articles about Maryon's 1953 presentation proliferated quickly and internationally, and his theory influenced Dalí.

Dalí and Hollywood 

Dalí had a longstanding fascination with Hollywood films; he described the industry as a surrealist medium, and Walt Disney, Cecil B. DeMille and the Marx Brothers as "the three great American Surrealists". In his 1937 essay Surrealism in Hollywood, he wrote that "Nothing seems to me more suited to be devoured by the surrealist fire than those mysterious strips of 'hallucinatory celluloid' turned out so unconsciously in Hollywood, and in which we have already seen appear, stupefied, so many images of authentic delirium, chance and dream."

Dalí was commissioned to create artwork for the Seven Wonders of the World, a 1956 travelogue exploring natural and man-made wonders. He completed several paintings in 1954: The Colossus of Rhodes, The Pyramids, The Statue of Olympian Zeus, The Temple of Diana at Ephesus, The Walls of Babylon, and two versions of the same wonder, The Lighthouse of Alexandria and Lighthouse of Alexandria. In 1955 he produced a further version of The Walls of Babylon, and painted the last wonder, The Mausoleum at Halicarnassus. The paintings were ultimately not used for the film.

Description 
The painting shows the Colossus of Rhodes standing on a base of unworked ashlar. The perspective is from below the statue's base, suggesting that the viewer is on a boat approaching the city, and emphasising the statue's extreme height and size. A piece of drapery wraps around the waist of Helios and hangs from his left arm, falling down to touch the ground behind him. Helios raises his right hand to shield his eyes from the sun over which he reigns, giving what the art historian Eric Shanes terms "a vaguely Surrealist touch" to Dalí's work. In the lower right Dalí signed and dated the work "Salvador Dalí / 1954".

Themes 
Dalí's most recognised works date from before 1940, when he was preoccupied with the subconscious and the nature of perception. The Persistence of Memory, the work with which he is most identified, was painted in 1931, and represented a decade that saw Dalí firmly within the avant-garde. His move to the United States in 1940 caused financial pressures, but brought to the fore his flair for showmanship, helping to develop his relationship with Hollywood. As World War II ended, Dalí's work turned towards the historical and religious, fused with aspects from modern culture and commercial art.

The Colossus of Rhodes exemplifies Dalí's preoccupations with cinema, history, and science, and his loosening grip on surrealism. It is only marginally surrealist—the god of the sun shields himself from his domain—and resembles a poster, befitting a work commissioned for a film. Dali's Colossus resembles comic-book superheroes and, particularly in the preparatory version, the Statue of Liberty. Compared with Maryon's paper, writes the scholar Godefroid de Callataÿ, the painting "does not look extremely original". Dalí copied the likeness of the Colossus put forth by Maryon, clearly depicting hammered plates of bronze, and showing the same tripod structure of a figure supported by a piece of drapery.

Provenance 
The painting is in the collection of the Kunstmuseum Bern, as part of the 1981 Georges F. Keller bequest. It was exhibited at the Museo de Arte Moderno in Madrid during 1983, at the Staatsgalerie Stuttgart in 1989, at the Louisiana Museum of Modern Art in Humlebæk from 1989 to 1990, and later in 1990 at the Musée des Beaux-Arts, Montreal.

Several other paintings from Dali's Seven Wonders of the World series have come up for sale. The Statue of Olympian Zeus was sold by Sotheby's in 2009 for $482,500, and is now in the collection of the Morohashi Museum of Modern Art. In 2013 Sotheby's sold The Temple of Diana at Ephesus for $845,000; it is now in a private collection. The Walls of Babylon was offered by Sotheby's in 2014 with an estimate of £300,000–400,000, but did not sell. Dalí's thematically similar 1955 paintings have been auctioned. Christie's sold The Mausoleum at Halicarnassus for $1,325,000 in 2016, and Walls of Babylon in 2001 for £168,750.

Versions 

Dalí created at least one preparatory study, First Version of The Colossus of Rhodes, a 1954 ink-on-cardboard work measuring  that includes three sketches of the Colossus. It was displayed at the Time Warner Center in New York from 3 November 2010 to 30 April 2011 as part of the exhibition Dalí at Time Warner Center: The Vision of a Genius, where it was also for sale.

Lithographs replicating the statue are frequently offered for sale. Owing to what Shanes calls Dalí's "exploitative and/or lackadaisical attitude", the trade in Dalí's lithographs is "in chaos". Dalí, eschewing the custom of limited printings with plates that were then destroyed, signed some 40,000 to 350,000 blank sheets of paper, which were then printed with his works. Coupled with rampant forgeries of an easily faked signature, this—termed by Shanes "one of the largest and most prolonged acts of financial fraud ever perpetrated in the history of art"—caused the lithographs to become virtually worthless.

Notes

References

Bibliography 
  
 
  
  
  
  
  
  
  
  
  
  
  
 
  
  
  
  
  
  
  
  
  
  
  

Paintings by Salvador Dalí
1954 paintings
Surrealist paintings
Paintings of Greek gods
Modern art
Water in art
Helios
Colossus of Rhodes